Oldřich Horák (born January 9, 1991) is a Czech professional ice hockey defenceman. He is currently a free agent have last played for SHK Hodonín in the 2nd Czech Republic Hockey League.

Horák made his Czech Extraliga debut playing with HC Zlín during the 2012–13 Czech Extraliga season.

References

External links

1991 births
Living people
AZ Havířov players
Boxers de Bordeaux players
HC Dukla Jihlava players
SHK Hodonín players
HC Olomouc players
PSG Berani Zlín players
HC ZUBR Přerov players
Orli Znojmo players
Sportspeople from Zlín
Stadion Hradec Králové players
VHK Vsetín players
Czech ice hockey defencemen
Czech expatriate sportspeople in France
Czech expatriate ice hockey people
Expatriate ice hockey players in France